The flag of Mordovia, in the Russian Federation, is a horizontal tricolour of red, white and blue.  It is charged with a brown-red sun emblem in the center of the white strip.  The emblem is divide into four parts, symbolizing the four Mordvin tribes.  Its proportions are 1:2:1.

The flag was adopted on 20 May 2008. The proportions are 2:3.

Historical flags

Other

See also
Flag of the Mordovian Autonomous Soviet Socialist Republic
Auseklis
Flag of Udmurtia

External links

Flags of the federal subjects of Russia
Flags introduced in 1995
Mordovia